Oțeleni is a commune in Iași County, Western Moldavia, Romania. It is composed of two villages, Hândrești and Oțeleni.

At the 2002 census, 99.9% of inhabitants were ethnic Romanians. 58.4% were Roman Catholic, 41.2% Romanian Orthodox and 0.3% Pentecostal.

References

Communes in Iași County
Localities in Western Moldavia